This is a list of heavy artillery weapons of the Imperial Japanese Navy of World War II.

Anti tank guns
Type 94 37 mm Anti-Tank Gun 
Model 96 25 mm AT/AA Gun
Type 1 37 mm Anti-Tank Gun 
Type 1 47 mm Anti-Tank Gun

Light anti-aircraft gun
Type 93 13.2 mm AA machinegun

Medium anti-aircraft gun
Model 96 25 mm Dual Purpose Anti-Tank/Anti-Aircraft Gun
Vickers Type 40 mm AT/AA Gun
Type 4 75 mm AA Gun
Type 11 75 mm AA Gun
Type 88 75 mm AA Gun

Heavy anti-aircraft gun
Type 3 12 cm AA Gun
Type 3 80 mm Anti-Aircraft Gun
Type 5 15 cm AA Gun (project)
Type 10 120 mm AA Gun
Type 14 10 cm AA Gun
Type 99 88 mm AA Gun

Rocket launcher (ground use)
25 mm Rocket Gun Launcher 
80 mm Anti-Tank Rocket Launcher 
100 mm Anti-Tank Rocket Launcher 
120 mm Rocket Launcher 
120 mm Six-Rocket Launcher 
200 mm Rocket Launcher Model 1
200 mm Rocket Launcher Model 2
200 mm Rocket Launcher Model 3
450 mm Heavy Rocket Launcher 
Type 6 Ground Use Bomb Projection Rocket Launcher Model 11 
Type 6 Ground Use Bomb Projection Rocket Launcher Model 13
Type 3 Rocket Launcher Model 1
Type 3 Rocket Launcher Model 2
Type 3 Rocket Launcher Model 2Modify 1

Rocket launcher (carrier-based)
75 mm Blast-Off Rocket Launcher 
120 mm Rocket Launcher 
Type 5 12 cm Rocket Launcher 
120 mm 30-Rocket Launcher 
150 mm Rocket Depth Bomb Launcher

In short, these weapon systems were some of the most technically advanced at the time. Even though they are dwarfed by the power, range, and accuracy of modern-day artillery, they are a testament to their time.

See also
 List of Japanese military equipment of World War II

artillery weapons of the Imperial Japanese Navy